Luče may refer to:

 Luče, a town and a municipality in Slovenia
 Luče, Grosuplje, a village in the Grosuplje municipality in central Slovenia

See also
Lucé (disambiguation)
Luce (disambiguation)
Luke (disambiguation)